Houghton Down is a hamlet in the civil parish of Houghton in the Test Valley district of Hampshire, England. Its nearest town is Stockbridge, which lies approximately 1.4 miles (2.6 km) east from the hamlet.

Villages in Hampshire
Test Valley